Whorf's law is a sound law in Uto-Aztecan linguistics proposed by the linguist Benjamin Lee Whorf. It explains the origin in the Nahuan languages of the phoneme  which is not found in any of the other languages of the Uto-Aztecan family. The sound law was labeled "Whorf's law" by Manaster Ramer and is still widely though not universally considered valid, although a more detailed understanding of the precise conditions under which it took place has been developed.

The situation had been obscured by the fact that often the */a/ had then subsequently been lost or changed to another vowel, making it difficult to realize what had conditioned the change. Because some Nahuan languages have /t/ and others have , Whorf thought that the law had been limited to certain dialects and that the dialects that had /t/ were more conservative. In 1978, Lyle Campbell and Ronald Langacker showed that in fact, Whorf's law had affected all of the Nahuan languages and that some dialects had subsequently changed  to /l/ or back to /t/, but it remains evident that the language went through a /tɬ/ stage.

In 1996, Alexis Manaster Ramer showed that the sound change had in fact also happened before the Proto-Aztecan high central vowel *//, itself derived from */u/ in certain situations and not just before */a/. Today, the best-known Nahuan language is Nahuatl.

Notes

References

Sound laws